is a Japanese TOPIX Large 70 company founded in 1959 as Sintered Metal Corporation, which specializes in pneumatic control engineering to support industrial automation.  SMC develops a broad range of control systems and equipment, such as directional control valves, actuators, and air line equipment, to support diverse applications.  SMC's head office is located in Sotokanda, Chiyoda-ku, Tokyo, Japan. The company has a global engineering network, with technical facilities in the United States, Europe and China, as well as Japan.  Key production facilities are located in China and Singapore, and local production facilities are in United States, Mexico, Brazil, Europe, India, Korea and Australia.

Market regions 

SMC has 400 marketing and sales offices in 81 countries worldwide.

1. North, Central and South America

Argentina, Bolivia, Brasil, Canada, Chile, Colombia, Ecuador, Mexico, Peru, United States, Venezuela, Costa Rica.

2. Europe

Albania, Austria, Belgium, Bosnia/Herzegovina, Bulgaria, Croatia, Czech Republic, Denmark, Estonia, Finland, France, Germany, Greece, 
Hungary, Ireland, Italy, Kazakhstan, Latvia, Lithuania, Macedonia, Netherlands, Norway, Poland, Portugal, Romania, Russia, Serbia, 
Slovakia, Slovenia, Spain, Sweden, Switzerland, Turkey, U.K., Ukraine

3. Africa

Algeria, Egypt, Kenya, Morocco, Nigeria, South Africa, Tunisia

4. Asia/Oceania

Australia, Bahrain, Bangladesh, China, Hong Kong, India, Indonesia, Iran, Israel, Japan, Jordan, Kuwait, Malaysia, New Zealand, Pakistan, 
Philippines, Qatar, Saudi Arabia, Singapore, South Korea, Sri Lanka, Syria, Taiwan, Thailand, United Arab Emirates, Viet Nam

References

External links 

 

Engineering companies based in Tokyo
Manufacturing companies based in Tokyo
Manufacturing companies established in 1959
1959 establishments in Japan
Companies listed on the Tokyo Stock Exchange
Japanese brands